The 1958–59 season was the 86th season of competitive football in Scotland and the 62nd season of the Scottish Football League.

Scottish League Division One

The last day of the season saw Rangers holding a two-point lead over Hearts, with the clubs having an identical goal average. Rangers lost 1–2 at home to Aberdeen, only for Hearts also to lose, 2–1 away to Celtic. Had Hearts won by any score they would have won the title.

Champions: Rangers
Relegated: Falkirk, Queen of the South

Scottish League Division Two

Promoted: Ayr United, Arbroath

Cup honours

Other honours

National

County

 – aggregate over two legs – replay – trophy shared

Highland League

Scotland national team

Key:
 (H) = Home match
 (A) = Away match
 BHC = British Home Championship

Notes and references

External links
Scottish Football Historical Archive

 
Seasons in Scottish football